Weasel (Jack Hammer) is a fictional character appearing in American comic books published by Marvel Comics. Weasel is a friend, sidekick, information broker and arms dealer for Deadpool. Weasel is perhaps Deadpool's best friend. However, because of his frequent mood swings and tenuous mental state, Deadpool still often abuses or mistreats him. Weasel has also displayed an opportunistic streak against his friend's interests on occasions. 

T.J. Miller portrayed the character in the films Deadpool (2016) and Deadpool 2 (2018).

Publication history
Created by writer Fabian Nicieza and artist Klaus Janson, Weasel first appeared in Cable #3 (July 1993).

Fictional character biography
Weasel was once a bright young lad attending Empire State University, where he was a classmate of Peter Parker and Gwen Stacy. Weasel, then known by his birth name of Jack Hammer, was competing with Parker for a prestigious job under the wing of Norman Osborn and held an enormous crush on Stacy, Parker's future girlfriend. Deadpool accidentally teleported into the past during a fight with the Great Lakes Avengers. In the past, he found Jack Hammer whose future he was well aware of. Disguised as Peter Parker, Deadpool related to Norman Osborn false information about Jack Hammer being a drug user. His employment opportunity thus ruined, Hammer was manipulated by the disguised Deadpool into fixing his teleportation belt. With the gadget fixed, Deadpool returns to the future, leaving a depressed and drunken young Hammer with a new career option: crime.

From that point on, Hammer adopted the name of Weasel and turned to a life consisting of providing intelligence, weapons and other technological devices to mercenaries and criminals, sometimes partaking in mercenary activities himself. It is during this period that Weasel (from his perspective) first met Deadpool in Canada, apparently meeting not long after Deadpool left Weapon X. Weasel quickly proved himself as an able informant and arms supplier to Deadpool and eventually came to form an uneasy friendship with him. He assisted his friend behind the scenes as Deadpool eventually came to work for a crime lord named Tolliver. After Tolliver's apparent death, the two  competed against a slew of other mercenaries, villains, heroes and assassins to become the beneficiaries of Tolliver's will, and later came to work at the Hellhouse, a hotbed of mercenary activity in Chicago where jobs were dispensed to those willing to take them. Deadpool, due to his prowess and cold heart, came to be feared and respected there, but often butted heads with another powerful mercenary, T-Ray. During this time, The Taskmaster abducted Weasel in order to procure his services. Initially allowing Deadpool to track him down, then switching off his tracking device (which was attuned to his heart) shortly before Taskmaster defeated Deadpool, Weasel revealed his confusion to both mercenaries due to Taskmaster's sweetened offer in spite of the somewhat mercurial loyalties shared between himself and Deadpool. However, when his friend baffled and conclusively defeated Taskmaster, he chose to return to his employ, encouraged in part by Deadpool's show of compassion for him and the promise of a new cable connection to the Playboy Channel. Weasel tried to mention Siryn, knowing the positive influence the Irish mutant had over Deadpool. Once again he was cowed by threats of physical violence. His loyalties to Deadpool were also further shown at the Hellhouse when it became apparent that T-Ray maintained a grip of intimidation over the other mercenaries when Deadpool was absent, even though he was in no position to stand up to T-Ray directly. Ultimately, T-Ray decided to organize a showdown with Deadpool and told Weasel to relay that information to Deadpool. In an effort to get in touch with his friend before the appointed showdown time, Weasel teleported to Deadpool's San Francisco home - a definite no-no. He was shooed out by Deadpool's friend/prisoner Blind Al, but when Weasel later made repeated visits to her, Deadpool discovered him there and placed both him and Blind Al in the Box, a dark room so filled with sharp objects and instruments of torture that movement is almost impossible. This latest abuse was the breaking point - Weasel decided to move on and left Deadpool after escaping from the Box, hoping to define his life outside of his association with Deadpool.

Fate had other designs, however. After Deadpool's death and subsequent resurrection some time afterward, Weasel ran into an amnesiac Deadpool. He helped to restore Deadpool's memory and thus restored their friendship before leaving once more. An on-again off-again association between the two occurred after this point, with Deadpool sometimes asking for goods or working with Weasel. However, another breaking point came when Deadpool stood up for Weasel when he was found hacking into a computer. When Deadpool found out that Weasel had lied, he refused to help Weasel, who was sent to jail. Weasel decided to atone for this crime by faithfully serving his time, and when he got out, coincidentally worked a job with Deadpool in Rumekistan. With Weasel having served time to appease Deadpool's anger and with Deadpool having TiVo'd all the episodes of Battlestar Galactica during Weasel's stay in jail to make up for his past abuses, the two became fast friends once more. He assisted Deadpool in the mercenary's latest voyage of self-discovery as Deadpool put himself in a series of situations to regain his rep as a mercenary, then made another attempt to become a hero. Weasel had Deadpool shrunk down to key-ring size in order to bolster his self-confidence, as he was no less effective in his greatly reduced size. On the last of these missions, Weasel was left in a Hydra base during an attack that was an attempt to give Deadpool more street-cred. While being imprisoned on the base, Weasel was apparently able to instead join Hydra, naming himself The Penetraitor, and created a teleportation machine for Hydra's use. This was interrupted by an attack on the base by Wolverine, coinciding with an attempted rescue by Deadpool and Bob, Agent of HYDRA. Deadpool and Bob were there because they knew Wolverine's attack would put Weasel's life in danger. Furthermore, Weasel's seeming joining of Hydra was a ruse; his teleportation gift simply sent the users straight to an American controlled prison. Although he is not explicitly stated to be a pet owner, Weasel takes Blind Al's dog at her request when he leaves Deadpool, and later on is shown to have a white cat in his apartment.

Weasel becomes an associate of the "good guy" mercenary firm Agency X.

"The House"
Weasel returns in Deadpool vol. 2 #23 as Las Vegas hero "The House". He is funded by the local casinos and takes pleasure at the chance to fight Deadpool. Using his vast knowledge of Deadpool, he quickly traps and defeats him, ultimately locking Wade in his own version of the Box. Deadpool quickly and inexplicably escapes and offers Weasel a chance to double his earnings. He then takes Weasel's extra suit of armor and the alias "Wildcard", acting as The House's sidekick. Later, in an encounter with a new Grizzly, unbeknownst to Weasel, Deadpool secretly tells Griz about a proposition he has for him. Grizzly manages to escape, and later, when Weasel and Deadpool meet with the casino owners, Deadpool reveals that he is in fact Wildcard, much to Weasel's fury. Later, Wade persuades Weasel to switch suits so that all the praise Wildcard gets will be for Weasel's good deeds. Weasel agrees to the plan, and the two once again face off with Grizzly, now back again and attempting to steal the millions of dollars in the casino's counting room. In the ensuing battle, Weasel fights Grizzly in the Wildcard suit while Deadpool sips drinks as The House. Unfortunately, everyone thinks Weasel is the one in The House suit drinking Lime Rickey's, and worst of all, Deadpool runs off with Grizzly and the cash. So when Deadpool tells the casino bosses that Weasel took off with the money because he wasn't getting any respect, they all believe him. They also believe him when he tells them that Weasel will be returning first thing in the morning. Meanwhile, Weasel talks on the phone with Blind Al, seeking advice, and resolves to take Deadpool down, against Blind Al's protests, and then spots an explosion in the distance. As it turns out, the explosion was caused by Deadpool, back at the casino with Grizzly and attempting to rob the vault. While Grizzly heads for the vault himself, Weasel arrives in the Wildcard suit and confronts Deadpool (who is still in The House's suit). In a parody of The Empire Strikes Back, Deadpool asks Weasel to join him. Weasel refuses and seemingly kills Deadpool by blowing his head off. Grizzly ends up being locked in the casino vault, though he still has the money. The casino owners still think that Weasel was the one in The House suit, so everyone ends up cheering for him as Grizzly is arrested. Later, in his lair, Weasel converses again with Blind Al, who insists that he tell the casino bosses the truth. Weasel is skeptical, but Blind Al reminds him about the possibility that they could have found Deadpool's body by now. Weasel then receives a call from the casino owners who reveal that they found no body. Deadpool shows up and explains that he snuck out of the suit under cover of the smoke from the explosion, and that the money in the casino vault was actually counterfeit money with his face on it. Weasel assumes that Deadpool will kill him, but Deadpool says that he won't, that he will help Weasel out of his jam, that he will take over the Wildcard suit, and that Weasel will have to lie low. When Weasel asks where he will go, Deadpool replies "I think we both know the answer to that one, buddy..." Later, when Deadpool meets with the casino owners, they claim that he said he'd taken care of Weasel. When they ask him how, he replies, "I put him in a Box."

Weasel is later freed from the Box by Macho Gomez, who recruits him to his team of people who were screwed over by, and want revenge on, Deadpool, and they confront him in Bob, Agent of HYDRA's garage. In the ensuing battle, Weasel begins to have second thoughts, saying to himself, "Stupid, stupid, stupid--I never shoulda come here! Deadpool's gonna do somethin' horrible to me, I know it!" to which Deadpool responds from across the room, "Hey, Weasel! Come over here so I can do something horrible to you!" Fortunately for Weasel, the team (minus Sluggo, whom Weasel inadvertently killed) managed to defeat Deadpool, and Weasel and the others left unscathed.

Patient Zero

After his death, Weasel was condemned to Hell, which he escapes from with the help of Mephisto. Rechristening himself Patient Zero, he then sets out to get revenge on both Deadpool and Peter Parker, hiring the former to assassinate the latter after making it look like torturous human experimentation was being conducted at Parker Industries, which Patient Zero also steals data from for use in transforming captured homeless people into "Manstrosities". After the Manstrosities are defeated in a confrontation with Spider-Man and Deadpool, Patient Zero splices the two heroes' DNA into another test subject, turning her into Itsy Bitsy, a psychotic vigilante with the combined powers of both Deadpool and Spider-Man. When his creation turns on him, a desperate Patient Zero reaches out to Spider-Man and Deadpool for aid, and is killed in front of them by Itsy Bitsy.

Patient Zero is then returned to Hell, and eventually visited by Deadpool, to whom he reveals his identity, explaining that he was motivated by Deadpool's past abuse and the belief that Deadpool has not changed, and has tricked the world into believing that deep down he is nothing more than "a scum-ridden murdering psychopath."

Weasel is afterward shown being offered another deal by Mephisto. This one involving Deadpool.

Alternate Universe
In the Deadpool Max continuity, Weasel is a skilled pimp, crime boss and driver.

Powers and abilities
Jack Hammer has no superpowers but he is an expert hacker and inventor with a genius-level intellect and knowledge of many weapons.

In other media

Film
 T. J. Miller portrays Weasel in the 2016 live-action film Deadpool. This version is the owner/bartender of Sister Margaret's School for Wayward Children, where Wade works as a mercenary. He bets on Wade to die in the "dead pool," which inspires Wade to adopt the code name later when he gets his powers. Unlike the comics, Weasel and Deadpool's friendship is far more mutual and less hate-based, whereas in the source material Deadpool frequently mistreats him.
 Miller reprised the role in the live-action sequel film Deadpool 2, wherein he helps the eponymous character assemble X-Force and is "tortured" by Cable for information regarding his friend.

Video games
Weasel appears as a non-playable character in Marvel: Ultimate Alliance, voiced by Cam Clarke. He works to discover whether Nick Fury's second-in-command, Black Widow, is a traitor to S.H.I.E.L.D. and requires help from the player. During the credits however, it is revealed that she had been using Weasel to steal information from S.H.I.E.L.D. and frame him for it.

References

External links
 Weasel at Marvel.com

Characters created by Fabian Nicieza
Characters created by Klaus Janson
Marvel Comics sidekicks
Comics characters introduced in 1993
Deadpool characters
X-Men supporting characters